TV de Mauritanie is the national broadcaster of the West African state of Mauritania. TV de Mauritanie currently broadcasts 24 hours a day in Arabic and French.

History
The first TV station in Mauritania started as a project supported by Iraqi funding in 1980, and was officially inaugurated in September 1982. On 10 July 1984 the channel started its broadcasts from their autonomous studios.

See also
 Media of Mauritania

References

External links
Official site

Television channels in Mauritania
Publicly funded broadcasters
Arabic-language television stations
Television channels and stations established in 1982
State media